The Bald Eagle and Spring Creek Navigation Company was a canal company in central Pennsylvania intended to link the iron industry of Bellefonte, Pennsylvania, with the Pennsylvania canal system. Opened for half its length in 1837, the remainder of the canal was not completed until 1848. Destroyed by flooding in 1865, it was not rebuilt; a paralleling railroad completed that year replaced it.

Charter and construction
The company was incorporated to build a canal from Flemington, Pennsylvania, a suburb of Lock Haven, to Bellefonte on April 14, 1834. Lock Haven was the terminus of the West Branch Canal, part of Pennsylvania's state-owned canal system following the West Branch Susquehanna River. The canal was planned to follow Bald Eagle Creek southwest through its valley as far as Milesburg, and then turn south to follow Spring Creek through its water gap in Bald Eagle Mountain to Bellefonte, center of the local iron industry. In theory, this entire route was navigable—residents of Bellefonte were said to have dragged a flatboat up Spring Creek in order to prove the town the head of navigation and beat out Milesburg as the county seat of Centre County in 1800—but in practice, improvements were necessary to facilitate the heavy traffic in iron from the furnaces.

 In preparation for the building of the Bald Eagle & Spring Creek, the Bald Eagle Cut, a  waterway, was built from the West Branch Canal through Lock Haven to the Bald Eagle Creek and the foot of the new canal. The  Lower Division of the Bald Eagle & Spring Creek was opened from Flemington to Howard, site of an iron furnace, in the fall of 1837. However, the Panic of 1837 led to straitened economic conditions throughout the country, and delayed further construction for a decade. The next segment, from Howard to Milesburg, was opened on September 3, 1837. The final segment along Spring Creek into Bellefonte, completing the  Upper Division, was opened on September 1, 1848. The first canal boat to arrive from Philadelphia was the Jane Curtin, carrying supplies for the Valentine & Thomas ironworks.

Operation and destruction
The canal quickly became a major shipper of bituminous coal and pig iron to downstream consumers, as well as a carrier of local agricultural traffic. However, the Commonwealth of Pennsylvania was experiencing increasing difficulties in funding the maintenance of its over-extended canal network. The Commonwealth was already involved in the financing of the Bald Eagle & Spring Creek, as guarantor of the annual interest on its stock, and it, together with the Bald Eagle Cross-Cut, the West Branch Canal, and the Susquehanna Division of the Pennsylvania Canal was divested in 1857. These waterways were initially given to the Sunbury and Erie Railroad, to help fund its completion, which in turn sold them to be organized as the West Branch and Susquehanna Canal.

During 1857, the canal was threatened by the prospect of a competitor. The Tyrone and Lock Haven Railroad was chartered to run down the Bald Eagle Valley between Tyrone and Lock Haven, and to build a branch to Bellefonte, paralleling the canal route. However, the Tyrone & Lock Haven was unable to secure sufficient financing for its immediate construction, completing only the branch from Bellefonte to Milesburg and a short section of line from Milesburg to the Bellefonte and Snow Shoe Railroad at Wingate by 1859. It was operated by the latter road for the next several years. Initially, the railroad was something of a boon to the canal: docks were built on the canal at Milesburg so that coal carried down by the railroad from the Snow Shoe area could be loaded into eastbound canal boats. However, this state of affairs was not to last. The Pennsylvania Railroad took up the financing of the Tyrone & Lock Haven, reorganized it as the Bald Eagle Valley Railroad, and pushed it to completion along the length of the Bald Eagle Valley in 1865.

The doom of the Bald Eagle and Spring Creek Navigation was at hand. Major flooding took place in the Susquehanna watershed during March 15–17, 1865, ravaging the canal infrastructure. With little prospect of effective competition with the new railroad line, it was never rebuilt.

Stonework from one of the locks is still visible at the former site of the McCoy and Linn ironworks, in the water gap of Spring Creek between Bellefonte and Milesburg. (The canal lock itself was not impacted by the removal of the 1926 hydroelectric dam at the ironworks site in August and September 2007, but the canal basin between the lock and the dam was filled in with the dam rubble as well as sediments that had built up behind the dam.) It is hoped that future archaeological work may be carried out on the lock itself and the stonework is in places in need of stabilization.

The remains of Locks #4 and #5 of this canal were included in the National Register of Historic Places nomination for Harmony Forge Mansion, and listed in 1979.

Points of interest

See also
List of canals in the United States

References

External links
Lock remains at the McCoy & Linn ironworks
Pennsylvania Canal Society
American Canal Society
National Canal Museum

Canals in Pennsylvania
Transportation buildings and structures in Centre County, Pennsylvania
Transportation buildings and structures in Clinton County, Pennsylvania
Canals opened in 1848